Eustachy Sanguszko may refer to:

 Eustachy Erazm Sanguszko (1768–1844), Polish noble, military commander, diplomat, and politician
 Eustachy Stanisław Sanguszko (1842–1903), Polish noble and politician